Hymenobacter flocculans  is a bacterium from the genus of Hymenobacter which has been isolated from a uranium mine waste water treatment system.

References

External links
Type strain of Hymenobacter flocculans at BacDive -  the Bacterial Diversity Metadatabase

flocculans
Bacteria described in 2011